Triandria is a suburb of the Thessaloniki Urban Area and was a former municipality in the regional unit of Thessaloniki, Greece. Since the 2011 local government reform it is part of the municipality Thessaloniki, of which it is a municipal unit. The municipal unit has an area of 1.475 km2. It is located east of Thessaloniki's city centre at an average elevation of 80m. It borders on the Thessaloniki districts of Saranta Ekklisies to the northwest and of Ano Toumpa to the southeast. Motorway 25, which forms the eastern beltway of Thessaloniki, passes east of Triandria. The suburb (borough) is named after the World War I-era "Triumvirate of National Defence" (Τριανδρία της Εθνικής Αμύνης), comprising the statesman Eleftherios Venizelos, together with Admiral Pavlos Koundouriotis and General Panagiotis Danglis.

Triandria has four elementary schools, two gymnasiums and a lyceum. There is also a church of Agios Spyridonas, the biggest in honor of the Saint outside the island of Corfu where he is considered a patron saint.

Sports
Achilleas Triandrias, football

Historical population

External links
Official website

See also
List of settlements in the Thessaloniki regional unit

References

Populated places in Thessaloniki (regional unit)